Puerto José Banús, more commonly known simply as Puerto Banús, is a marina located in the area of Nueva Andalucía, to the southwest of Marbella, Spain on the Costa del Sol. It was built in May 1970 by José Banús, a local property developer, as a luxury marina and shopping complex. It has since become one of the largest entertainment centres in the Costa del Sol, with 5 million annual visitors, and is popular with international celebrities. Developed around a coastal village in the Mediterranean architectural style, Puerto Banús contains high-end shopping malls, restaurants and bars around the marina.

History
The architect Noldi Schreck, who participated in the design and construction of Beverly Hills, was visited in 1966 by Prince Alfonso de Hohenlohe to ask him to work on the Hotel Marbella Club. Schreck's first job was to meet José Banús (a close friend of Francisco Franco), and convince him that Puerto Banús was not a suitable place to build huge skyscrapers that would house thousands of wealthy families. He proposed a sophisticated Andalusian village and marina, the first port made by a single architect. José Banús became the largest developer of residential tourism complexes on the Costa del Sol. The port took his name and he became famous with the epithet "the regime’s builder."

The lavish opening of the complex in May 1970 was attended by, amongst others, the Aga Khan, film director Roman Polanski, Playboy founder Hugh Hefner, Dr. Christiaan Barnard (pioneer of the heart transplant), and Prince Rainier and Princess Grace of Monaco. A young Julio Iglesias was hired to sing for the guests for the sum of 125,000 pesetas. Three hundred waiters from Seville served 22 kilos of beluga caviar to 1700 guests.

In 2011, it was reported that one of the largest-scale developments in Marbella's history was to take place with a 400 million euro investment into La Bajadilla, east of Marbella, by Qatari Sheikh Abdullah bin Nasser bin Khalifa Al Thani which included a  quay for cruise liners, a five-star hotel on the marina, as well as bars, restaurants, shops and supermarkets to compete with Puerto Banús.

Geography and climate

The climate of the area is protected in its northern part by the Coast Mountain Range of Cordillera Penibética.

There is a good network of roads and transport services connecting Puerto Banús with adjacent towns and suburbs.

The complex

According to the Municipality of Marbella, Puerto Banús is visited annually by nearly 5 million people. Visitors to the port tend to be mostly tourists from northern Europe (especially United Kingdom) and Arabs (especially Kuwait and Saudi Arabia), along with Spanish and Russian tourists. The focal point of Puerto Banús is the marina. It has berths for 915 boats, including those of the King of Saudi Arabia and several of the world's wealthiest individuals. Behind the harbour lie streets filled with bars, boutiques and nightclubs. There is a beach on each side of the marina where boats can be hired.

Transport
From Málaga airport, transport options include car rental, taxi, or bus. The main road A-7 also known as the Autovia del Mediterraneo on its way to Puerto Banus has the toll road or the non toll road which has views from the Costa.

Shopping

Its streets are lined with expensive luxury boutiques like Christian Dior, Gucci, Bulgari, Versace, Dolce & Gabbana, Elisabetta Franchi and others. One stretch is known as "The Golden Mile". Apart from the chain of restaurants, boutiques, in the heart of the Antonio Banderas Square is one of the largest El Corte Inglés department stores in Spain, including the up-scale hypermarket, Hipercor.

The Boulevard de la Fama de Puerto Banús was created to pay tribute to individuals who have promoted Marbella nationally or internationally through their professional work.

Culture
A three-ton statue of a rhinoceros by Salvador Dalí was placed in Puerto Banús in 2004. Officially known as Rinoceronte vestido con puntillas ("Rhinoceros dressed in lace"), Dalí created the sculpture in 1956 following the filming of his surrealist movie La aventura prodigiosa de la encajera y el rinoceronte ("The prodigious adventure of the lacemaker and the rhinoceros") in 1954. Another impressive statue sculpted in bronze and copper by the Georgian sculptor Zurab Tsereteli is that of "La Victoria", which stands tall at  height over a granite pedestal. Unveiled in 1994, it was a gift from the Mayor of Moscow.

References

External links

Buildings and structures in Marbella
Coasts of Spain
Tourist attractions in Andalusia
Sport in Marbella
Marinas in Spain